Epinotia javierana is a species of moth of the family Tortricidae. It is found in Argentina.

The wingspan is about 17 mm. The ground colour of the forewings is yellowish suffused with brownish, but cream in the posterior part of the wing. The hindwings are pale greyish brown.

Etymology
The species name refers to San Javier, the type locality.

References

Moths described in 2007
Eucosmini
Moths of South America
Taxa named by Józef Razowski